The Ford Falcon (XB) is a full-size car that was produced by Ford Australia from 1973 to 1976. It was the second iteration of the third generation of the Falcon and also included the Ford Fairmont (XB), the luxury-oriented version.

Overview
The XB series bore minor cosmetic differences to the preceding model, the XA, aimed at giving the car a more muscular stance. First time equipment offerings included standard front disc brakes on all models and an available carpeted interior.

Model range
The XB Falcon range included the following models:

A Grand Sport Rally Pack option, which included bonnet scoops, striping, GS insignia and "GT" instrumentation, was available on Falcon 500, Futura and Fairmont models.

Sovereign Edition
In July 1974, a special Falcon Sovereign Edition was released to celebrate Ford Australia's 50th anniversary. It was based on a Falcon 500 fitted, as standard, with a vinyl roof, Fairmont wheel covers, carpet, transistor radio and three thin body stripes. No records were kept on these cars so exact specifications and build quantities are unknown. Production of the Sovereign is believed to have ended in July 1975.

John Goss Special

Among the limited edition variants of the XB was the John Goss Special, released in 1975 and named for the race driver who took a Falcon to victory in the 1974 Hardie-Ferodo 1000 Touring Car race at Bathurst.  These specials were based on the Falcon 500 Hardtop, with decals and other bolt on options, such as the GT Bonnet. They were available in White with a choice of two accent colors: Emerald Fire and Apollo Blue.

McLeod Ford "horn" cars
Max McLeod owned a Ford dealership in Rockdale, New South Wales, a suburb of Sydney, and sponsored John Goss entered Falcons in the South Pacific Touring Series, ATCC and multiple Bathurst 1000 races. In addition to further modifications to Fords own John Goss Special, McLeod offered the "horn" pack to various Falcon models. These cars are known for their stand-out "strobe" stripes that were applied to the cars, these stripes were the same as used in the McLeod sponsored John Goss racing cars.

Production
Production of the XB series totalled 211,971 vehicles.

Motorsport
 
Allan Moffat won the 1974 Sandown 250 driving an XB Falcon GT Hardtop. He also won the 1976 Australian Touring Car Championship driving an XB Falcon GT Hardtop and drove both an XB Falcon GT Hardtop and an XC Falcon GS Hardtop to win the 1977 Australian Touring Car Championship.

In film
In the 1979 film Mad Max, the title character's black "Pursuit Special" was a  version of a 1973 Ford XB GT Falcon Hardtop. Two 1974 XB sedans were also used as Main Force Patrol Interceptor vehicles. More Falcons were used to depict the Pursuit Special in sequels Mad Max 2 (1981) and Mad Max: Fury Road (2015).

A Falcon GT (XB) Hardtop is the subject of Eric Bana's 2009 documentary film Love the Beast. The film documents the 25-year history of Bana's Falcon, which he purchased at the age of 15.

References

External links
Ford XB Falcon Sedan brochure Retrieved from www.uniquecarsandparts.com.au on 21 February 2009
XB Falcon Technical Specifications Retrieved from www.uniquecarsandparts.com.au on 21 February 2009

Cars of Australia
Cars introduced in 1973
1970s cars
XB
XB Falcon
Sedans
Station wagons
Coupé utilities
Vans
Rear-wheel-drive vehicles